The 2021–22 Green Bay Phoenix men's basketball team represented the University of Wisconsin–Green Bay in the 2021–22 NCAA Division I men's basketball season. The Phoenix, led by second-year head coach Will Ryan, split their home games between the Resch Center in Ashwaubenon, Wisconsin and the Kress Events Center in Green Bay, Wisconsin. The competed as members of the Horizon League. They finished the season 5–25, 4–16 in Horizon League play to finish in 11th place. They lost in the first round of the Horizon League Tournament to Detroit Mercy.

Previous season
In a season limited due to the ongoing COVID-19 pandemic, the Phoenix finished the 2020–21 season 8–17, 8–12 in Horizon League play to finish in ninth place. As the No. 7 seed in the Horizon League tournament, they lost to Purdue Fort Wayne in the first round.

Roster

Schedule and results

|-
!colspan=12 style=| Exhibition

|-
!colspan=12 style=| Regular season

|-
!colspan=9 style=| Horizon League tournament

Source

References

Green Bay Phoenix men's basketball seasons
Green Bay Phoenix
Green Bay Phoenix men's basketball
Green Bay Phoenix men's basketball